Ivan Tomašević may refer to:

 Ivan Tomašević (soldier), Croatian soldier and an NDH general
 Ivan Tomašević (activist), Croatian labourer and political activist in New Zealand